The Self-administered Gerocognitive Examination is a brief cognitive assessment instrument for mild cognitive impairment (MCI) and early dementia, created by Douglas Scharre, Professor of Clinical Neurology and Psychiatry at Ohio State University Wexner Medical Center in Columbus, Ohio.

A digital version exists.

See also 
 Addenbrooke's cognitive examination
 Mental status examination
 Montreal Cognitive Assessment
 Saint Louis University Mental Status Exam
 Informant Questionnaire on Cognitive Decline in the Elderly
 NIH stroke scale

References

Cognitive impairment and dementia screening and assessment tools
Cognitive tests
Neuropsychological tests
Geriatrics